Rohde & Schwarz SwissQual AG is a telecommunications company specializing in wireless network service quality benchmarking and network optimization. The company is a contributor to ITU-T standards for speech and video quality assessment.

Company history
Rohde & Schwarz SwissQual AG was founded in 2000 and was the first company to introduce specialized wireless network benchmarking equipment.

In January 2006 the company was acquired by Spirent for $65m.

In 2007 the company was divested by Spirent and acquired by a group of private investors.

In March 2010 SwissQual announced they had carried out network quality drive testing on the world's first commercial LTE network, TeliaSonera in Sweden.

In July 2012, SwissQual became a wholly independent subsidiary of Rohde & Schwarz. R&S is a German testing equipment manufacturer.

In July 2018, the company changed its name to Rohde & Schwarz SwissQual AG.

Speech and video quality algorithms
 In June 2010 SwissQual was one of three companies selected to provide the next generation high definition voice testing standard POLQA.
 In January 2011 SwissQual was the only company selected to provide the next generation high definition video testing standard VQuad-HD / J.341.
 In 2015 SwissQual in collaboration with Deutsche Telekom T-Labs in Berlin developed the standard J.343.1 "RS-T-VModel".

References

External links

Telecommunications companies of Switzerland